Czarni Żagań is a Polish association football club based in Żagań, Lower Silesia.

History
The club was founded in 1957 by soldiers from the Żagań Garrison. It is the most successful football teams in Lubusz Voivodeship; only Czarni from this voivodeship reached the final of the Polish Cup. They lost 4–0 to Górnik Zabrze. After the 1965 final, Czarni should have played in the 1965–66 European Cup Winners' Cup, but for political and military reasons, Czarni didn't join the competition. 

In the years 2019–2021, there was a senior women's team. The resulting crisis on the Polish-Belarusian border meant that at the beginning of November 2021 most players of Czarni serving in the Polish Armed Forces received official orders, which prevented them from representing Czarni in the last four games of the IV liga in 2021. 

The Lubusz Football Association didn't allow the matches of Czarni to be postponed due to the possibility of suspending the games in connection with the COVID-19 pandemic.

Season statistics

Women

Men

Honours
National Polish Cup:
Finaists - 1x: 1964/1965	

Regional Polish Cup:	
Winners - 5x: 1962/1963, 1976/1977, 1978/1979, 1980/1981, 1999/2000	
Finalists	- 5x: 1952, 1963/1964, 1979/1980, 1981/1982, 1990/1991

References

Football clubs in Poland
Military association football clubs in Poland
Association football clubs established in 1957
1957 establishments in Poland
Football clubs in Lubusz Voivodeship
Żagań County